Danielle Walker (born February 1985) is an American writer, founder and editor of the gluten and grain-free food blog Against All Grain, and the best-selling cookbook of the same name.

Career 

Walker began experimenting with healthy cooking because she was suffering from the inflammatory bowel disease ulcerative colitis. She tried the specific carbohydrate diet but found that it did not totally relieve her symptoms.  After some research, she tried the paleo diet and found that it helped her treat her condition.

To disseminate her own recipes and other healthy diet information Walker created Against All Grain, a blog covering specialty diets including Paleo, Gluten-free, and specific carbohydrate diet.

Walker also wrote and illustrated a best-selling specialty diet cookbook titled Against All Grain: Delectable Paleo Recipes to eat Well & Feel Great, which covers many of the recipes included on her blog, and new recipes. Against All Grain has been listed for 24 weeks as a New York Times best-selling book The book has been praised for Walker's photography.

Walker was featured on Steven and Chris, a Canadian talk show on CBC Television, where she made spinach sausage lasagna.

Bibliography 

Walker, Danielle (2014). Danielle Walker's Against All Grain: Meals Made Simple: Gluten-Free, Dairy-Free, and Paleo Recipes to Make Anytime. Amazon: Victor Belt. .
Walker, Danielle (2016). Danielle Walker's Against All Grain Celebrations: A Year of Gluten-Free, Dairy-Free, and Paleo Recipes for Every Occasion. Amazon: Ten Speed Press. . 
Walker, Danielle (2018). Danielle Walker's Eat What You Love: Everyday Comfort Food You Crave; Gluten-Free, Dairy-Free, and Paleo Recipes. Amazon: Ten Speed Press. .

References

External links
 

1985 births
Living people
American women nutritionists
American nutritionists
American women bloggers
American bloggers
Women cookbook writers
Gluten-free cookbook writers
Paleolithic diet advocates
People from Castro Valley, California
21st-century American women writers
21st-century American non-fiction writers
American women non-fiction writers
Writers from California